House of Traps is a 1982 Shaw Brothers film directed by Chang Cheh, starring the Venom Mob. The story is based on the 19th-century novel The Seven Heroes and Five Gallants.

Plot

When a corrupt prince arranges for the theft of a highly valuable jade antique the emperor dispatches his best men to retrieve it. The only problem is that the prince has hidden the antique in the infamous 'house of traps' from which no man has ever made it out alive. Royal investigator Yan Chunmin and his men mount a daring raid on the prince's birthday which results in the usual mayhem expected from a Venoms film.

Cast

Production notes
House of Traps was previously considered one of the rarest Venom films, as it was only available on poor VHS and VCD formats. However, House of Traps was remastered and released on DVD 9 September 2008 by Image Entertainment . The DVD includes the original Mandarin language soundtrack with subtitles, as well as an English-dubbed soundtrack. The DVD is from the Shaw Brothers Collection series, which is distributed under the Celestial Pictures banner of Image Entertainment. 
 
Despite the DVD release, the film falls under WTO regulations for fair-use and free distribution. Celestial's release is approximately 20 minutes shorter than the VHS and VCD versions, as many of the most damaged frames were cut entirely. The Celestial version of the film, under Chinese law, is materially different enough to be classified as a new work and is copyrighted as such. Only a handful of VHS originals are known to exist.

References

External links
 House of Traps on IMDb

1982 films
Kung fu films
1980s Mandarin-language films
Hong Kong martial arts films
Shaw Brothers Studio films
Films based on The Seven Heroes and Five Gallants
Films directed by Chang Cheh
1980s Hong Kong films